Mosul (Turkish: Musul) is a major city in northern Iraq, serving as the capital of Nineveh Governorate. The city is considered the second largest city in Iraq in terms of population and area after the capital Baghdad, with a population of over 3.7 million. The Mosul metropolitan area has grown from the old city on the western side to encompass substantial areas on both the "Left Bank" (east side) and the "Right Bank" (west side), as locals call the two riverbanks. Mosul encloses the ruins of the ancient Assyrian city of Nineveh on its east side.

Mosul and its surroundings have an ethnically and religiously diverse population; a large majority of its population are Arabs, with Assyrians, Turkmens, and Kurds, and other, smaller ethnic minorities comprising the rest of the city's population. Sunni Islam is the largest religion, but there are a significant number of Christians, as well as adherents of other sects of Islam and various other minority religions.

Mosul is considered among the larger and more historically and culturally significant cities of the Arab world. Due to Mosul's strategic location, it has traditionally served as a hub of international commerce and travel. The North Mesopotamian dialect of Arabic, commonly known as Moslawi, is named after Mosul and is widely spoken in the region.

Historically, essential products of the area include Mosul marble and oil. Mosul is home to the University of Mosul and its renowned Medical College, one of the Middle East's largest educational and research centers.

Together with the nearby Nineveh Plains, Mosul is one of the historical centers of the Assyrian people.

Etymology
The city's name is first mentioned by Xenophon in his expeditionary logs in Achaemenid Assyria of 401 BC, during the reign of the Persian Achaemenid Empire. There, he notes a small Assyrian town of "Mépsila" on the Tigris around where Mosul is today (Anabasis, III.iv.10). In any case, "Mepsila" is doubtless the root of the current name.

In its current Arabic form and spelling, the term Mosul, or rather "Mawsil," means "linking point"—or, loosely, "Junction City," in Arabic. On Mosul's eastern side are the ruins of the ancient city of Nineveh, and Assyrians still call the entire city Nineveh (or Ninweh).

Mosul is also nicknamed al-Faiha ("the Paradise"), al-Khaḍrah ("the Green"), and al-Hadbah ("the Humped"). It is sometimes called "The Pearl of the North" and "the city of a million soldiers."

History

Ancient era and early Middle Ages

The area where Mosul lies was an integral part of Assyria from as early as the 25th century BC. After the Akkadian Empire (2335–2154 BC), which united all the peoples of Mesopotamia under one rule, Mosul again became a continuous part of Assyria proper from circa 2050 BC through the fall of the Neo-Assyrian Empire between 612 and 599 BC. Mosul remained within the geopolitical province of Assyria for another 13 centuries (as a part of Achaemenid Assyria, Seleucid, Roman Assyria and Sasanian Asōristān) until the early Muslim conquests of the mid-7th century. After the Muslim conquests, the region saw a gradual influx of Muslim Arab, Kurdish, and Turkic peoples, although indigenous Assyrians continued to use the name Athura for the ecclesiastical province. 

Nineveh was one of the oldest and most significant cities in antiquity and was settled as early as 6000 BC. The city is mentioned in the Old Assyrian Empire (2025–1750) and during the reign of Shamshi-Adad I (1809–1776 BC) it was listed as a center of worship of the goddess Ishtar, remaining so during the Middle Assyrian Empire (1365–1056 BC). During the Neo-Assyrian Empire (911–605 BC), Nineveh grew in size and importance, particularly from the reigns of Tukulti-Ninurta II and Ashurnasirpal II (883–859 BC) onward; he chose the city of Kalhu (the Biblical Calah, modern Nimrud) as his capital in place of the ancient traditional capital of Aššur (Ashur),  from present-day Mosul. 

Thereafter, successive Assyrian emperor-monarchs, such as Shalmaneser III, Adad-nirari III, Tiglath-Pileser III, Shalmaneser V and Sargon II, continued to expand the city. Around 700 BC, King Sennacherib made Nineveh Assyria's new capital. Immense building work was undertaken, and Nineveh eclipsed Babylon, Kalhu and Aššur in size and importance, making it the largest city in the world. Many scholars believe the Hanging Gardens of Babylon were at Nineveh.

The mound of Kuyunjik in Mosul is the site of the palaces of King Sennacherib and his successors Esarhaddon, Ashurbanipal, (who established the Library of Ashurbanipal),  Ashur-etil-ilani, Sin-shumu-lishir and Sin-shar-ishkun. The Assyrian Empire began to unravel in 626 BC, being consumed by a decade of brutal internal civil wars, significantly weakening it. A war-ravaged Assyria was attacked in 616 BC by a vast coalition of its former subjects, most notably their Babylonian relations from southern Mesopotamia, together with the Medes, Persians, Chaldeans, Scythians, Cimmerians, and Sagartians. Nineveh fell after a siege and bitter house-to-house fighting in 612 BC during the reign of Sin-shar-ishkun, who was killed defending his capital. His successor, Ashur-uballit II, fought his way out of Nineveh and formed a new Assyrian capital at Harran (now in southeastern Turkey). 

Mosul (then the Assyrian town of Mepsila, founded by the former inhabitants out of the ruins of their former capital) later succeeded Nineveh as the Tigris bridgehead of the road that linked Assyria and Anatolia with the short-lived Median Empire and succeeding Achaemenid Empire (546–332 BC), where it was a part of the geopolitical province of Athura (Assyria), where the region, and Assyria in general, saw a significant economic revival. 

Mosul became part of the Seleucid Empire after Alexander's conquests in 332 BC. While little is known of the city from the Hellenistic period, Mosul likely belonged to the Seleucid satrapy of Syria, the Greek term for Assyria ("Syria" originally meaning Assyria rather than the modern nation of Syria), which the Parthian Empire conquered circa 150 BC. 

Mosul changed hands again with the rise of the Sasanian Empire in 225 and became a part of the Sasanian province of Asōristān. Christianity was present among the indigenous Assyrian people in Mosul as early as the 1st century, although the ancient Mesopotamian religion remained strong until the 4th century. It became an episcopal seat of the Assyrian Church of the East in the 6th century. 

In 637 (other sources say 641), during the period of the Caliph Umar, Mosul was annexed to the Rashidun Caliphate by Utba ibn Farqad al-Sulami during the early Arab Muslim invasions and conquests, after which Assyria dissolved as a geopolitical entity.

9th century to 1535

In the late 9th century the Turkish dynasts Ishaq ibn Kundaj and his son Muhammad seized control over Mosul, but in 893 Mosul came once again under the direct control of the Abbasid Caliphate. In the early 10th century Mosul came under the control of the native Arab Hamdanid dynasty. From Mosul, the Hamdanids under Abdallah ibn Hamdan and his son Nasir al-Dawla expanded their control over Upper Mesopotamia for several decades, first as governors of the Abbassids and later as de facto independent rulers. A century later they were supplanted by the Uqaylid dynasty. Ibn Hawqal, who visited Mosul in 968, described it as a beautiful town inhabited mainly by Kurds.

Mosul was conquered by the Seljuk Empire in the 11th century. After a period under semi-independent atabeg such as Mawdud, in 1127 it became the centre of power of the Zengid dynasty. Saladin besieged the city unsuccessfully in 1182 but gained control of it in 1186. In the 13th century it was captured by the Mongols led by Hulagu Khan, but was spared the usual destruction since its governor, Badr al-Din Lu'lu', helped the Khan in his following campaigns in Syria.

After the Mongol defeat in the Battle of Ain Jalut against the Mamluks, Badr al-Din's son sided with the latter; this led to the city's destruction. It later regained some importance but never recovered its original splendor. Mosul was thenceforth ruled by the Mongol Ilkhanate and Jalairid Sultanate and escaped Timur's destructiveness.

In 1165, Benjamin of Tudela passed through Mosul; he wrote that he found a small Jewish community estimated at 7,000 people in Mosul, led by Rabbi Zakkai, presumably connected to the Davidic line. In 1288–89, the Exilarch was in Mosul and signed a supporting paper for Maimonides. In the early 16th century, Mosul was under the Turkmen federation of the Ağ Qoyunlu, but in 1508 it was conquered by the Safavid dynasty of Iran.

Metalworking industry

In the 13th century, Mosul had a flourishing industry making luxury brass items that were ornately inlaid with silver. Many of these items survive today; in fact, of all medieval Islamic artifacts, Mosul brasswork has the most epigraphic inscriptions. However, the only reference to this industry in contemporary sources is the account of Ibn Sa'id, an Andalusian geographer who traveled through the region around 1250. He wrote that "there are many crafts in the city, especially inlaid brass vessels which are exported (and presented) to rulers". These were expensive items that only the wealthiest could afford, and it wasn't until the early 1200s that Mosul had the demand for large-scale production of them. Mosul was then a wealthy, prosperous capital city, first for the Zengids and then for Badr al-Din Lu'lu'.

The origins of Mosul's inlaid brasswork industry are uncertain. The city had an iron industry in the late 10th century, when al-Muqaddasi recorded that it exported iron and iron goods like buckets, knives and chains. However, no surviving metal objects from Mosul are known before the early 13th century. Inlaid metalworking in the Islamic world was first developed in Khurasan in the 12th century by silversmiths facing a shortage of silver. By the mid-12th century, Herat in particular had gained a reputation for its high-quality inlaid metalwork. The practice of inlaying "required relatively few tools" and the technique spread westward, perhaps by Khurasani artisans moving to other cities.

By the turn of the 13th century, the silver-inlaid-brass technique had reached Mosul. A pair of engraved brass flabella found in Egypt and possibly made in Mosul are dated by a Syriac inscription to the year 1202, which would make them the earliest known Mosul brasses with a definite date (although they are not inlaid with anything). One extant item may be even older: an inlaid ewer by the master craftsman Ibrahim ibn Mawaliya is of an unknown date, but D.S. Rice estimated that it was made around 1200. Production of inlaid brasswork in Mosul may have already begun before the turn of the century.

The body of Mosul metalwork significantly expands in the 1220s - several signed and dated items are known from this decade, which according to Julian Raby "probably reflects the craft's growing status and production." In the two decades from roughly 1220 to 1240, the Mosul brass industry saw "rapid innovations in technique, decoration, and composition". Artisans were inspired by miniature paintings produced in the Mosul area.

Mosul seems to have become predominant among Muslim centers of metalwork in the early 13th century. Evidence is partial and indirect - relatively few objects which directly state where they were made exist, and in the rest of cases it depends on nisbahs. However, al-Mawsili is by far the most common nisbah; only two others are attested: al-Is'irdi (referring to someone from Siirt) and al-Baghdadi. There are, however, some scientific instruments inlaid with silver that were made in Syria during this period, with the earliest being 1222/3 (619 AH).

Instability after the death of Badr al-Din Lu'lu' in 1259, and especially the Mongol siege and capture of Mosul in July 1262, probably caused a decline in Mosul's metalworking industry. There is a relative lack of known metalwork from the Jazira in the late 1200s; meanwhile, an abundance of metalwork from Mamluk Syria and Egypt is attested from this same period. This doesn't necessarily mean that production in Mosul ended, though, and some extant objects from this period may have been made in Mosul.

The earliest definite evidence of Mawsili craftsmen emigrating westward to Mamluk Syria and Egypt dates from the 1250s. Extant Mawsili works from these regions seem to be the result of one particular family setting up workshops in Damascus and then Cairo rather than a mass movement of Mosul artisans to those cities. Five Mawsili craftsmen are known from these two cities in the late 13th century, of which 3 or 4 are members of this same family. The first is Husayn ibn Muhammad al-Mawsili, who produced the earliest known silver-inlaid work from Damascus in the late 1250s. His presumed son, Ali ibn Husayn ibn Muhammad al-Mawsili, was active in Cairo several decades later. However, the earliest known silver-inlaid brasswork from Cairo belongs to another presumed member of this family, Muhammad ibn Hasan. His one known work, a candlestick dated to 1269, has an inscription which suggests he died before it was completed. The "key figure" for early Mamluk metalwork in Cairo, however, was Ali ibn Husayn. His works from the 1280s both show Mosul influence as well as a different "early Mamluk" style. A final member was Husayn ibn Ahmad ibn Husayn, a grandson of Husayn ibn Muhammad, who was active at the turn of the 14th century and made "a major work" for the Rasulid sultan al-Mu'ayyad Hizabr al-Din Dawud ibn Yusuf. This family appears to have initiated "two of the most characteristic features of 14th-century Mamluk metalwork: large-scale inspirational candlesticks, and large multi-lobed medallions with a wide border that eventually became filled with flying ducks".

Elsewhere, Mosul metalwork eventually influenced a tradition of metal inlay in Fars and elsewhere in western Iran in the 14th century. The Ilkhanids rounding up artisans and gathering them in their capital of Tabriz for centralized royal production may have played a role in this transmission.

Only two items are definitively known to have been produced in Mosul. The first is the Blacas ewer, made by Shuja' ibn Man'a in 1232, and the second is a silver-inlaid pen box made by Ali ibn Yahya in 1255/6 (653 AH). No other works by either craftsman are known. They form part of the broader Mosul work which consists of 35 known surviving brasses made by artisans with the nisbah al-Mawsili, by some 27 different makers. 80% of them are from the years 1220 to 1275, and the remaining 20% are from 1275 to about 1325.

Modern western scholarship has termed this body of metalwork attributed to Mosul the "Mosul School", although the validity of this grouping is disputed. The "indiscriminate" attribution of silver-inlaid brasses to Mosul, particularly by Gaston Migeon at the turn of the 20th century, led to a reaction against the term. Later scholars such as Max van Berchem, Mehmet Ağa-Oğlu, and D.S. Rice all took a more skeptical view; van Berchem in particular argued that only six known items could be definitely attributed to Mosul, and others were likely made elsewhere. Souren Melikian-Chirvani remarked in 1973 that Mosul had been famous in the west for a century for metalwork it did not make. However, Julian Raby has defended the concept of the Mosul School, arguing that the city did have a distinct metalworking tradition with its own techniques, styles and motifs, and sense of community. He compared Mosul's metalwork to Kashan's pottery and wrote that "Mawsili metalworkers displayed a conscious sense of community and tradition and, at least in the early years, a proud acknowledgement of tradition" and that the city's metalwork gained a wide reputation or "brand value" lasting for over a century.

Part of Raby's argument was that many items shared one or two recurring symbols that "served no practical purpose" and may have been meant as a "brand", "workshop mark", a "guild emblem", or "perhaps as a mark of master craftsmanship". The first one is an octagon filled with complex geometric patterns, which appears on at least 13 items over the course of three decades: the 1220s through the 1240s. Several of the most important Mosul artists from what Raby terms the "second generation of Mosul metalwork" all used this symbol: Ahmad al-Dhaki, Ibn Jaldak, Shuja' ibn Man'a, Dawud ibn Salama, and Yunus ibn Yusuf. A notable absence is Ibrahim ibn Mawaliya, a member of the first generation. The octagon disappears after about 1250, and is also not used by workers known to have been outside Mosul.

Another recurring symbol is a rosette with either 10 or 12 leaves found at the bottom of the item - either the base of a ewer or the bottom of the shaft of a candlestick. This is not normally visible, and perhaps because it served no practical purpose, it was eventually abandoned around the middle of the century. The last example of this rosette is the bottom of a candlestick made by Dawud ibn Salama in 1248/9 (646 AH).

Raby suggested that Ibrahim ibn Mawaliya "may have been a seminal figure" in the Mosul brasswork industry. The particular phrasing of the "benedictory inscriptions" on his objects, bestowing good luck on their owners, is repeated in several works by other Mosul craftsmen. Two assistants of Ibrahim ibn Mawaliya's are known: his tilmidh (apprentice) Isma'il ibn Ward, and his ghulam Qasim ibn Ali. Ahmad al-Dhaki's workshop was possibly also "intimately connected to others in Mosul".

The Mosul metalwork is the only example in the Muslim world where metalworkers recorded their relationships between masters and apprentices (tilmidh) and hirelings (ajir). This was apparently a point of pride for Mosul artisans. Julian Raby speculated that two elaborate but impractically tiny Mosuli objects, a tiny 6x4 cm box made by Isma'il ibn Ward and an anonymous 8-cm-tall bucket, were made as "credential work" by apprentice or journeyman metalworkers as part of a test to be accepted into a craftsman's guild.

According to Raby, the Mosul metalwork may have been part of the gifts that Badr al-Din Lu'lu' gave to other rulers to appease them as part of his realpolitik diplomacy.

Ottoman period

What started as irregular attacks in 1517 were finalized in 1538, when Ottoman Sultan Suleiman the Magnificent added Mosul to his empire by capturing it from his archrival, Safavid Persia. Thenceforth Mosul was governed by a pasha. Mosul was celebrated for its line of walls, comprising seven gates with large towers, a renowned hospital (maristan) and a covered market (qaysariyya), and its fabrics and flourishing trades.

Mesopotamia had been acquired by the Ottoman Empire in 1555 by the Peace of Amasya, but until the Treaty of Zuhab in 1639 Ottoman control over Mesopotamia was not decisive. After the Peace of Amasya, the Safavids recaptured most of Mesopotamia one more time during the reign of king Abbas I (r. 1588–1629). Among the newly appointed Safavid governors of Mesopotamia during those years was Qasem Sultan Afshar, who was appointed governor of Mosul in 1622. Before 1638, the Ottomans considered Mosul "still a mere fortress, important for its strategic position as an offensive platform for Ottoman campaigns into Iraq, as well as a defensive stronghold and staging post guarding the approaches to Anatolia and to the Syrian coast. Then, with the Ottoman reconquest of Baghdad (1638), the liwa of Mosul became an independent wilaya."

Despite being a part of the Ottoman Empire, during the four centuries of Ottoman rule Mosul was considered "the most independent district" within the Middle East, following the Roman model of indirect rule through local notables. "Mosuli culture developed less along Ottoman–Turkish lines than along Iraqi–Arab lines; and Turkish, the official language of the State, was certainly not the dominant language in the province."

In line with its status as a politically stable trade route between the Mediterranean and the Persian Gulf, Mosul developed considerably during the 17th and early 18th centuries. Like the development of the Mamluk dynasty in Baghdad, during this time "the Jalili family was establishing itself as the undisputed master of Mosul" and "helping to connect Mosul with a pre-Ottoman, pre-Turcoman, pre-Mongol, Arab cultural heritage that was to put the town on its way to recapturing some of the prestige and prominence it had enjoyed under the golden reign of Badr ad-Din Lu’lu’."

Along with the al-Umari and Tasin al-Mufti families, the Jalilis formed an "urban-based small and medium gentry and a new landed elite", which proceeded to displace the control of previous rural tribes. Such families establish themselves through private enterprise, solidifying their influence and assets through rents on land and taxes on manufacturing.

As well as by elected officials, Mosul's social architecture was highly influenced by the Dominican fathers who arrived in Mosul in 1750, sent by Pope Benedict XIV (Mosul had a large Christian population, predominantly indigenous Assyrians). In 1873 they were followed by the Dominican nuns, who established schools, health clinics, a printing press, an orphanage, and workshops to teach girls sewing and embroidery. A congregation of Dominican sisters founded in the 19th century still had its motherhouse in Mosul in the early 21st century. Over 120 Assyrian Iraqi Sisters belonged to this congregation.

In the 19th century the Ottoman government started to reclaim central control over its outlying provinces. Their aim was to "restore Ottoman law, and rejuvenate the military" and to revive "a secure tax base for the government". In order to reestablish rule, in 1834 the sultan abolished public elections for governor, and began "neutraliz[ing] local families such as the Jalilis and their class" and appointing new, non-Maslawi governors directly. In line with its reintegration within central government rule, Mosul was required to conform to new Ottoman reform legislation, including the standardization of tariff rates, the consolidation of internal taxes and the integration of the administrative apparatus with the central government.

This process started in 1834 with the appointment of Bayraktar Mehmet Pasha, who was to rule Mosul for the next four years. After his reign, the Ottoman government (wishing still to restrain the influence of powerful local families) appointed a series of governors in rapid succession, ruling "for only a brief period before being sent somewhere else to govern, making it impossible for any of them to achieve a substantial local power base." Mosul's importance as a trading center declined after the opening of the Suez Canal, which enabled goods to travel to and from India by sea rather than by land through Mosul.

Mosul was the capital of Mosul Vilayet, one of the three vilayets (provinces) of Ottoman Iraq, with a brief break in 1623, when Persia seized the city.

During World War I, the Ottoman Empire sided with Germany, the Austro-Hungarian Empire and Bulgaria against the British Empire, France and the Russian Empire. In northern Mesopotamia, northern Syria and southeast Turkey the Ottomans held the armed support of the Kurds, Turcomans, Circassians and some Arab groups, while the British and Russians were militarily supported by the Assyrians and Armenians (particularly in the wake of the Armenian genocide and Assyrian genocide), and some Arab groups. The Ottomans were defeated, and in 1918 the British occupied Mosul and the whole of Iraq.

1918 to 1990s
At the end of World War I in October 1918, after the Armistice of Mudros, British forces occupied Mosul. After the war, the city and surrounding area became part of the British-occupied Iraq (1918–1920) and then Mandatory Iraq (1920–1932). This mandate was contested by Turkey, which continued to claim the area on the grounds that it was under Ottoman control during the signature of the Armistice.

In the Treaty of Lausanne, the dispute over Mosul was left for future resolution by the League of Nations. In 1926, Iraq's possession of Mosul was confirmed by the League of Nations' brokered agreement between Turkey and Great Britain. Former Ottoman Mosul Vilayet became the Nineveh Governorate of Iraq, but Mosul remained the provincial capital.

Mosul's fortunes revived with the discovery of oil in the area, from the late 1920s onward. It became a nexus for the movement of oil via truck and pipeline to Turkey and Syria. Qyuarrah Refinery was built within about an hour's drive from the city and was used to process tar for road-building projects. It was damaged but not destroyed during the Iran–Iraq War.

The opening of the University of Mosul in 1967 enabled the education of many in the city and surrounding area.

After the 1991 uprisings by the Kurds, Mosul did not fall within the Kurdish-ruled area, but was included in the northern no-fly zone imposed and patrolled by the United States and Britain between 1991 and 2003.

Although this prevented Saddam's forces from mounting large-scale military operations again in the region, it did not stop his regime from implementing a steady policy of "Arabisation" by which the demography of some areas of Nineveh Governorate were gradually changed. Despite this program, Mosul and its surrounding towns and villages remained home to a mixture of Arabs, Kurds, Assyrians, Armenians, Turkmens, Shabaks, a few Jews, and isolated populations of Yazidis, Mandeans, Kawliya and Circassians.

Saddam was able to garrison portions of the 5th Army within Mosul, had Mosul International Airport under military control, and recruited heavily from Mosul for his military's officer corps. This may have been because most of the Iraqi Army officers and generals were from Mosul long before the Saddam regime.

2003 American invasion

When the 2003 invasion of Iraq was being planned, the United States had originally intended to base troops in Turkey and mount a thrust into northern Iraq to capture Mosul, but the Turkish parliament refused to grant permission for the operation. When the Iraq War broke out in March 2003, U.S. military activity in the area was confined to strategic bombing with airdropped special forces in the vicinity. Mosul fell on 11 April 2003, when the Iraqi Army 5th Corps, loyal to Saddam, abandoned the city and surrendered two days after the fall of Baghdad. U.S. Army Special Forces with Kurdish fighters quickly took civil control of the city. Thereafter began widespread looting before an agreement was reached to cede overall control to U.S. forces.

On 22 July 2003, Saddam Hussein's sons, Uday Hussein and Qusay Hussein, were killed in a gun battle with Coalition forces in Mosul after a failed attempt at their capture. Mosul also served as the operational base for the US Army's 101st Airborne Division during the occupational phase of the Operation Iraqi Freedom. During its tenure, the 101st Airborne Division was able to extensively survey the city and, advised by the 431st Civil Affairs Battalion, non-governmental organizations, and the people of Mosul, began reconstruction work by employing the people of Mosul in security, electricity, local governance, drinking water, wastewater, trash disposal, roads, bridges, and environmental concerns.

Other U.S. Army units to have occupied the city include the 4th Brigade Combat Team of the 1st Cavalry Division, the 172nd Stryker Brigade, the 3rd Brigade-2nd Infantry Division, 18th Engineer Brigade (Combat), Alpha Company 14th Engineer Battalion-555th Combat Engineer Brigade, 1st Brigade-25th Infantry Division, the 511th Military Police Company, the 812th Military Police Company and company-size units from Reserve components, an element of the 364th Civil Affairs Brigade, and the 404th Civil Affairs Battalion, which covered the areas north of the Green Line. The 67th Combat Support Hospital (CSH) deployed in support of Operation Iraqi Freedom (OIF) from January 2004 to January 2005, running split based operations in Mosul and Tikrit. The Task Force (TF) 67 Headquarters and Company B operated out of Forward Operating Base (FOB) Diamondback (Mosul), and Company A operating out of FOB Speicher (Tikrit).

On 24 June 2004, a coordinated series of car bombs killed 62 people, many of them policemen.

On 21 December 2004, 14 U.S. soldiers, four American employees of Halliburton, and four Iraqi soldiers were killed in a suicide attack on a dining hall at the Forward Operating Base (FOB) Marez next to the main U.S. military airfield at Mosul. The Pentagon reported that 72 other personnel were injured in the attack, carried out by a suicide bomber wearing an explosive vest and the uniform of the Iraqi security services. The Islamist group Army of Ansar al-Sunna (partly evolved from Ansar al-Islam) took responsibility for the attack in an online statement.

In December 2007, Iraq reopened Mosul International Airport. An Iraqi Airways flight carried 152 Hajj pilgrims to Baghdad, the first commercial flight since U.S. forces declared a no-fly zone in 1993, though further commercial flight remained prohibited. On 23 January 2008, an explosion in an apartment building killed 36 people. The next day, a suicide bomber dressed as a police officer assassinated the local police chief, Brigadier General Salah Mohammed al-Jubouri, the director of police for Nineveh province, as he toured the site of the blast.

In May 2008, US-backed Iraqi Army Forces led by Major General Riyadh Jalal Tawfiq, the commander of military operations in Mosul, launched a military offensive of the Ninawa campaign in hopes of bringing stability and security to the city. The representatives of Mosul in the Iraqi Parliament, the intellectuals of the city, and other concerned humanitarian groups agreed on the pressing need for a solution to the city's unbearable conditions, but still believed the solution was political and administrative. They also questioned whether such a large-scale military offensive would spare the lives of innocent people.

All these factors deprived the city of its historical, scientific and intellectual foundations between 2003 and 2008, when many scientists, professors, academics, doctors, health professionals, engineers, lawyers, journalists, religious clergy (both Muslim and Christian), historians, as well as professionals and artists, were either killed or forced to leave the city under the threat of being shot, exactly as happened elsewhere in Iraq in those years.

Christian exodus
In 2008, many Assyrian Christians (about 12,000) fled the city, following a wave of murders and threats against their community. The murder of a dozen Assyrians, threats that others would be murdered unless they converted to Islam, and the destruction of their houses sparked a rapid exodus of the Christian population. Some fled to Syria and Turkey; others were given shelter in churches and monasteries. Accusations were exchanged between Sunni fundamentalists and some Kurdish groups of being behind this new exodus. Some claims linked it to the provincial elections of January 2009, and the related Assyrian Christians' demands for broader representation in the provincial councils.

Mosul was attacked on 4 June 2014. After six days of fighting, on 10 June the Islamic State took over the city during the June 2014 Northern Iraq offensive. By August, the city's new ISIL administration was dysfunctional, with frequent power cuts, a tainted water supply, collapse of infrastructure, and failing health care.

Government by the Islamic State

On June 10, 2014, the Islamic State captured Mosul, after the Iraqi troops stationed there withdrew. Troop shortages and infighting among top officers and Iraqi political leaders played into ISIL's hands and fueled panic that led to the city's abandonment. Half a million people escaped on foot or by car during the next two days. According to western and pro-Iraqi government press, Mosul residents were de facto prisoners, forbidden to leave the city unless they left ISIL a significant collateral of family members, personal wealth and property. They could then leave after paying a significant "departure tax" for a three-day pass (for a higher fee they could surrender their home, pay the fee and leave for good) and if those with a three-day pass failed to return within that time, their assets would be seized and their family killed. While ISIL ruled Mosul with an extreme monopolization of violence and committed many acts of terror, some scholars argue that it also had a highly efficient bureaucratic government that ran a highly functioning state within Mosul's borders via sophisticated diwans (governing bodies).

Ali Ghaidan, a former commander of the Iraqi ground forces, accused al-Maliki of being the one who issued the order to withdraw from the city. A short period of time after, Al-Maliki called for a national state of emergency on 10 June following the attack on Mosul, which had been seized overnight. Despite the security crisis, Iraq's parliament did not allow Maliki to declare a state of emergency; many legislators boycotted the session because they opposed expanding the prime minister's powers, since his reign has been described as sectarian by both Iraqis and western analysts, as well allegations of corruption, with hundreds of billions of dollars allegedly vanishing from government coffers.

After more than two years of ISIL occupation of Mosul, Iraqi forces, with the help of American and French forces launched a joint offensive to recapture it on 16 October 2016. The battle for Mosul was considered key in the military intervention against ISIL. A military offensive to retake the city was the largest deployment of Iraqi forces since the 2003 invasion by U.S. and coalition forces On 9 July 2017, Prime Minister Haider Al-Abadi arrived in preparation to announce the full liberation and reclamation of Mosul after three years of ISIL control. A formal declaration was made on the next day. The battle continued for another couple of weeks in the Old City before Iraqi forces regained full control of Mosul on 21 July 2017.

Demographics

According to Salahuddin Khuda Bakhsh, the Arab geographer Ibn Hawqal was at Mosul in 969 AD (358 AH) He called it a "fine town with excellent markets, surrounded by fertile districts of which the most celebrated was that round Nineveh where the prophet Jonah was buried. In the 10th century the population consisted chiefly of Kurds, and the numerous districts round Mosul, occupying all Diyir Rabi'ah, are carefully enumerated by Ibn Hawkal."

In 1813, James Playfair, the author of the book A System of Geography: Ancient and Modern wrote, 

But Mosul has had various ethnic groups during its history. In 1923, half of its population was Kurd. In the 20th century, Mosul was indicative of Iraq's mingling ethnic and religious cultures. Today Mosul has a Sunni Arab majority in urban areas, such as downtown Mosul west of the Tigris; across the Tigris and further north in the suburban areas, thousands of Assyrians, Kurds, Turkmens, Shabaks, Yazidis, Armenians and Mandeans made up the rest of Mosul's population. Shabaks were concentrated on the city's eastern outskirts.

Religion

Mosul has a predominantly Sunni population. This city had an ancient Jewish population. Like their counterparts elsewhere in Iraq, most were forced out in 1950–51. Most Iraqi Jews have moved to Israel, and some to the United States. In 2003, during the Iraq War, a rabbi in the American army found an abandoned, dilapidated synagogue in Mosul dating to the 13th century.

During ISIL's occupation, religious minorities were targeted to convert to Islam, pay tribute (jizya) money, leave, or be killed. The persecution of Christians in Mosul and the surrounding Nineveh Plains removed a Christian community that had been present in the region since the 1st century.

Infrastructure

The Mosul Dam was built in the 1980s to supply Mosul with hydroelectricity and water. Despite this, water supply cuts are still common.

Five bridges cross the Tigris in Mosul, known from north to south as:
Al Shohada Bridge (or "Third Bridge")
Fifth Bridge
Old Bridge (or "Iron Bridge", or "First Bridge")
Al Huriya Bridge (literally "Freedom Bridge", also known as "Second Bridge"): located about 1 km north of the 4th bridge and 0.8 km south of the 1st bridge, the al-Huriya Bridge connects the neighborhoods of Bab at-Tawb on the west bank and al-Faisaliyyah on the east bank. It was built between 1955-58 by German, French, and Dutch companies. Made of steel with concrete supports, the bridge has 6 spans and is 340 m long. A two-way street with one lane in each direction goes across the bridge, and there is also a sidewalk on both sides. Before the bridge's destruction in 2016, an estimated 10,495 vehicles crossed the bridge per day, for a total of some 3.8 million vehicles per year. In October 2016, a US airstrike destroyed the bridge's first span (starting from the left) along with the left-bank approach. Later, bombings by the Islamic State destroyed three more spans (the 4th, 5th, and 6th) and damaged the last two (2nd and 3rd spans). In the aftermath, Iraqi Army forces installed a temporary pontoon bridge 0.2 km north of the al-Huriya Bridge to provide an alternate route for commuters.
Fourth Bridge
During the Battle of Mosul (2016–17) between ISIL and the Iraqi Army supported by an international coalition, two bridges were 'damaged' by coalition airstrikes in October 2016, two others in November, and the Old Bridge was 'disabled' in early December. According to the BBC, in late December the bridges were targeted to disrupt the resupply of ISIL forces in East Mosul from West Mosul. In January 2017, CNN reported that ISIL itself had 'destroyed' all bridges to slow the Iraqi ground troops' advance, citing Iraqi commander Lieutenant General Abdul Amir Rasheed Yarallah.

During the last stages of the battle to retake Mosul, Lise Grande stated that per an initial assessment, basic infrastructure repair would cost over 1 billion USD. She stated that while stabilization in east Mosul could be achieved in two months, in some districts of Mosul it might take years, with six out of 44 districts almost completely destroyed. Every district of Mosul received light or moderate damage. Per the United Nations, 15 of the 54 residential districts in the western half of Mosul were heavily damaged while at least 23 were moderately damaged.

Mosul is served by Mosul International Airport.

Geography 

Mosul stands 223 meters above sea level in the Upper Mesopotamia region of the Middle East. To the south west of Mosul is the Syrian Desert and to the East is the Zagros Mountains.

Climate 
Mosul has a hot semi-arid climate (BSh), verging on the Mediterranean climate (Csa), with extremely hot, prolonged, dry summers, brief and mild autumn and spring, and moderately wet, relatively cool winters.

Historical and religious buildings
Mosul is rich in old historical places and ancient buildings: mosques, castles, churches, monasteries, and schools, many of which have architectural features and decorative work of significance. The town centre is dominated by a maze of streets and 19th-century houses. The markets are known for the mixture of people who jostle there: Arabs, Kurds, Assyrians, Iraqi Jews, Kurdish Jews, Iraqi Turkmens, Armenians, Yazidi, Mandeans, Romani and Shabaks.

The Mosul Museum contains many finds from the ancient sites of the old Assyrian capital cities Nineveh and Nimrud. It is laid-out around a courtyard and with a façade of Mosul marble containing displays of Mosul life depicted in tableau form. On February 26, 2015, ISIL militants destroyed the museum's ancient Assyrian artifacts.

The English writer Agatha Christie lived in Mosul while her second husband, Max Mallowan, an archaeologist, was involved in the excavation in Nimrud.

Mosques and shrines

 Umayyad Mosque: The first ever in the city, built in 640 AD by Utba bin Farqad Al-Salami after he conquered Mosul in the reign of Caliph Umar ibn Al-Khattab. The only original part extant to recent times was the remarkably elaborate brickwork 52m high minaret that leans like the Leaning Tower of Pisa, called Al-Hadba (The Humped). It was largely destroyed during the Battle of Mosul.
 The Great (Nuriddin) Mosque: Built by Nuriddin Zangi in 1172 AD next door to the Umayyad Mosque. Ibn Battuta (the great Moroccan traveller) found a marble fountain there and a mihrab (the niche that indicates the direction of Mecca) with a Kufic inscription. It was destroyed during the Battle of Mosul.
 Mujahidi Mosque: The mosque dates back to 12th century AD, and is distinguished for its shen  dome and elaborately wrought mihrab.
 Prophet Younis Mosque and Shrine: Located east of the city, and included the tomb of Prophet Younis (Jonah), dating back to the 8th century BC, with a tooth of the whale that swallowed and later released him. It was completely demolished by IS in July 2014.
 Prophet Jirjis Mosque and Shrine: The late 14th century mosque and shrine honoring Prophet Jirjis (George) was built over the Quraysh cemetery. It was destroyed by IS in July 2014.
 Prophet Daniel Shrine: A Tomb attributed to Prophet Daniel was destroyed by IS in July 2014.
 Hamou Qado (Hema Kado) Mosque: An Ottoman-era mosque in the central Maydan area built in 1881, and officially named Mosque of Abdulla Ibn Chalabi Ibn Abdul-Qadi. It was destroyed by IS in March 2015 because it contained a tomb that was revered and visited by local Muslims on Thursdays and Fridays.

Churches and monasteries

Mosul had the highest proportion of Assyrian Christians of all the Iraqi cities outside of the Kurdish region, and contains several interesting old churches, some of which originally date back to the early centuries of Christianity. Its ancient Assyrian churches are often hidden and their entrances in thick walls are not easy to find. Some of them have suffered from overmuch restoration.
 Shamoun Al-Safa (St. Peter, Mar Petros): This church dates from the 13th century is and named after Shamoun Al-Safa or St. Peter (Mar Petros in Assyrian Aramaic). Earlier it had the name of the two Apostles, Peter and Paul, and was inhabited by the nuns of the Sacred Hearts.
 Church of St. Thomas (Mar Touma in Assyrian Aramaic): One of the oldest historical churches, named after St. Thomas the Apostle who preached the Gospel in the East, including India. The exact time of its foundation is unknown, but it was before 770 AD, since Al-Mahdi, the Abbasid Caliph, is mentioned as listening to a grievance concerning this church on his trip to Mosul.
 Mar Petion Church: Mar Petion, educated by his cousin in a monastery, was martyred in 446 AD. It is the first Chaldean Catholic church in Mosul, after the union of many Assyrians with Rome in the 17th century. It dates back to the 10th century, and lies 3 m below street level. This church suffered destruction, and it has been reconstructed many times. A hall was built on one of its three parts in 1942. As a result, most of its artistic features have been severely damaged.
 Ancient Tahira Church (The Immaculate): Near Bash Tapia, considered one of the most ancient churches in Mosul. No evidence helps to determine its exact area. It could be either the remnants of the church of the Upper Monastery or the ruined Mar Zena Church. Al-Tahira Church dates back to the 7th century, and it lies 3 m below street level. Reconstructed last in 1743.
 Al-Tahera Church: Syriac Catholic Church completed in 1862.
 Mar Hudeni Church: It was named after Mar Ahudemmeh (Hudeni) Maphrian of Tikrit who was martyred in 575 AD. Mar Hudeni is an old church of the Tikritans in Mosul. It dates back to the 10th century, lies 7 m below street level and was first reconstructed in 1970. People can get mineral water from the well in its yard. The chain, fixed in the wall, is thought to cure epileptics.
 St. George's Monastery (Mar Gurguis): One of the oldest churches in Mosul, named after St. George, located to the north of Mosul, was probably built late in the 17th century. Pilgrims from different parts of the North visit it yearly in the spring, when many people also go out to its whereabouts on holiday. It is about 6 m below street level. A modern church was built over the old one in 1931, abolishing much of its archeological significance. The only monuments left are a marble door-frame decorated with a carved Estrangelo (Syriac) inscription, and two niches, which date back to the 13th or 14th century.
It was built by Mar Matte, a monk who fled with several other monks in 362 AD from the Monastery of Zuknin near the City of Amid (Diyarbakir) in the southern part of Asia Minor (modern Turkey) and the north of Iraq during the reign of Emperor Julian the Apostate (361–363 AD). It has a precious library containing Syrianic scriptures.
The monastery, a great fort-like building, rises next to the tomb of Mar Behnam, a prince who was killed by the Sassanians, perhaps during the 4th century AD. A legend made him a son of an Assyrian king.
 St. Elijah's Monastery (Dair Mar Elia): Dating from the 6th century, it was the oldest Christian Monastery in Iraq, until its destruction by IS in January 2016.

Other Christian historical buildings:
 The Roman Catholic Church (built by the Dominican Fathers in Nineveh Street in 1893)
 Mar Michael
 Mar Elias
 Mar Oraha
 Rabban Hormizd Monastery, the monastery of Notre-Dame des Semences, near the Assyrian town of Alqosh

Other sites
 Bash Tapia Castle: A ruined castle rising high over the Tigris, which was one of the few remnants of Mosul's old walls until it was blown up by IS in 2015.
 Qara Saray (The Black Palace): The remnants of the 13th-century palace of Sultan Badruddin Lu'lu'.

Arts

Painting

The so-called Mosul School of Painting refers to a style of miniature painting that developed in northern Iraq in the late 12th to early 13th century under the patronage of the Zangid dynasty (1127–1222). In technique and style the Mosul school was similar to the painting of the Seljuq Turks, who controlled Iraq at that time, but the Mosul artists had a sharper sense of realism based on the subject matter and degree of detail in the painting rather than on representation in three dimensions, which did not occur. Most of the Mosul iconography was Seljuq—for example, the use of figures seated cross-legged in a frontal position. Certain symbolic elements, however, such as the crescent and serpents, were derived from the classical Mesopotamian repertory.

Most Mosul paintings were manuscript illustrations—mainly scientific works, animal books, and lyric poetry. A frontispiece painting, now held in the Bibliothèque nationale, Paris, dating from a late 12th century copy of Galen's medical treatise, the Kitab al-diriyak ("Book of Antidotes"), is a good example of the earlier work of the Mosul school. It depicts four figures surrounding a central, seated figure who holds a crescent-shaped halo. The painting is in a variety of whole hues; reds, blues, greens, and gold. The Küfic lettering is blue. The total effect is best described as majestic.

Another mid-13th century frontispiece held in the Nationalbibliothek, Vienna, to another copy of the same text suggests the quality of later Mosul painting. There is realism in its depiction of the preparation of a ruler's meal and of horsemen engaged in various activities, and the painting is as many hued as that of the early Mosul school, yet it is somehow less spirited. The composition is more elaborate but less successful. By this time the Baghdad school, which combined the styles of the Syrian and early Mosul schools, had begun to dominate. With the invasion of the Mongols in the mid-13th century the Mosul school came to an end, but its achievements were influential in both the Mamluk and the Mongol schools of miniature painting.

Education
Mosul has several universities and colleges. These include the University of Mosul, which is the largest university in Mosul, Ninevah University, Al-Hadbaa University College, and the Northern Technical University.

Mosul also has multiple highschools some of which are coeducational while others are gender segregated. These include but are not limited to:

 Al-Hafsah School
 Al-Haj Secondary School for Girls
 Kourtoba High School for Girls
 Al-Mouhobeen Secondary School for Boys and Girls
 Al-Mustaqbal High School for Boys
 Al-Mutamaizat High School for Girls
 Al-Mutamaizeen High School for Boys
 Al-Resalah Al-Islamia (Al-Resalah) High School for Boys
 Al-Sharqiya High School for Boys

Sport
The city has one football team capable of competing in the top-flight of Iraqi football – Mosul FC.

Al Mosul University Stadium is the home stadium to Mosul FC and can hold up to 20,000 people.

The University of Mosul contains a College of Physical Education and Sports Science which teaches undergraduate and graduate students and performs research in three scientific departments.

Media

Newspapers
Ash-Shabibah, a defunct daily newspaper

Notable people

 Abdulahad AbdulNour, physician and humanitarian
 Thabit AbdulNour, Iraqi Politician, Government Administrator, and Diplomat
 Zaha Hadid, noted architect and first woman to win the Pritzker award. Was named "dame" by Queen Elizabeth II.
 Al Jalili, Hussein Pasha, raised and led army to defend Mosul against Persian Shah Nadir Shah, 1743.
 Al Jalili, Ismael, Eye doctor who discovered and researched the Jalili syndrome.
 Al Jamil, Sayyar, Historian and political analyst.
 Abu Al Soof, Behnam, Archeologist, anthropologist, historian and writer of Christian ancestry.
 Tariq Aziz, Assyrian Deputy Prime Minister 1979–2003 (real name Michael Youkhanna) (from Tel Keppe)
 Munir Bashir, Assyrian musician who had several successes in the Mideast during the 20th century
 Asenath Barzani, first Jewish female rabbi
 Vian Dakhil, Yazidi member of the Iraqi parliament.
 Hawar Mulla Mohammed, Kurdish Iraqi soccer player for the national team
 Paulos Faraj Rahho, Assyrian Chaldean Catholic Archbishop of Mosul, assassinated 2008
 Taha Yassin Ramadan, Kurdish former Vice President of Iraq
 Hormuzd Rassam, Assyrian Archaeologist and diplomat of the 19th century
 Kathem Al Saher, Arab Iraqi pop singer, songwriter, and musician
 Adnan Koucher, Iraqi scholar
 Salah al-Din al-Sabbagh, Arab Iraqi Army officer
Salah Salim Ali, Norwegian Iraqi Writer and translator, author of Ibsen i Arabia.
 Ignatius Gabriel I Tappouni, Assyrian Patriarch of Antioch and all east for the Syriac Catholic Church between 1929 and 1968, Church Father of the Second Vatican Council and the first Eastern Rite prelate to be raised to the College of Cardinals since the reign of Pope Pius IX
 Behnam Afas, Iraqi-New Zealander author and researcher into the role of Christian scholars and missionaries
 Ghazi Mashal Ajil al-Yawer, Arab Interim President of Iraq during 2004–05
 Ignatius Zakka I, Assyrian Patriarch of Antioch and all east for the Syriac Orthodox Church
 Mosul Eye, Mosul Eye (Arabic: عين الموصل) is a news blog created and maintained by historian and citizen journalist Omar Mohammed.
 Loris Ohannes Chobanian, Armenian-American composer and professor at Baldwin Wallace University

See also

 List of largest cities of Iraq
 List of rulers of Mosul
 University of Mosul
 Iraq
 Nineveh Governorate
 Mosul District
 Assyrian homeland
 Asteroid 22292 Mosul named after the city in 2018
 Battle of Mosul (2016–2017)
 Chaldean Catholic Archeparchy of Mosul
 Mosul question
 Nineveh Plains

References

Sources

External links

 ninava-explorer
 Iraq Image – Mosul Satellite Observation
 Detailed map of Mosul by the National Imagery and Mapping Agency, from lib.utexas.edu
 

 
Cities in Iraq
District capitals of Iraq
Populated places in Nineveh Governorate
Populated places on the Tigris River
Assyrian communities in Iraq
Turkmen communities in Iraq
Shabak communities
Historic Jewish communities in Iraq